Trukhmen (tr. Түрпен дили, Türpen dili) is a dialect of the Turkmen language. It is used by Trukhmens in Stavropol krai (Russia).

Trukhmen contains lots of characteristic features, but is influenced by the Nogai language (especially in phonetics, grammatical structures and, to some extent, in vocabulary). The main cause of dialectal differences in Trukhmen is the contact of its speakers with other ethnic groups, such as Nogais and Kumyks. There is no written literature in Trukhmen - the Trukhmens use Russian as their literary language. Russian is also one of the languages which has an impact on their mother tongue.

References 

Turkmen language
Languages of Russia